The 1955 Argentine Primera División was the 64th season of top-flight football in Argentina. The season began on April 30 and ended on December 11.

River Plate won the championship while Platense was relegated.

League standings

References

Argentine Primera División seasons
Argentine Primera Division
1955 in Argentine football